The Diocese of Emly can refer to:
The Roman Catholic diocese of Emly is incorporated into the  Roman Catholic Archdiocese of Cashel and Emly
The Church of Ireland diocese of Emly is incorporated into the United Dioceses of Limerick, Ardfert, Aghadoe, Killaloe, Kilfenora, Clonfert, Kilmacduagh and Emly

See also
The Bishop of Emly
The Archbishop of Cashel and Emly

Former Roman Catholic dioceses in Ireland
Former Church of Ireland dioceses in Ireland